Serge Arnaud Aka (born 16 November 1994) is an Ivorian professional footballer who plays as a midfielder for Turkish club Altay.

Professional career
Aka began his senior career with the Ivorian clubs Satellite, Africa Sports, Bouaké and ASEC Mimosas. He moved to Tunisia with CS Sfaxien in 2018. He joined El Gouna in the Egyptian Premier League on 2 January 2019. On 4 August 2021, he transferred to the Turkish club Altay, as they were newly promoted into the Süper Lig.

International career
Aka was called up to the Ivory Coast national team for a pair of friendlies in May 2021.

References

External links
 
 FDB Profile
 The Players Agent Profile

1994 births
Living people
People from Divo, Ivory Coast
Ivorian footballers
Africa Sports d'Abidjan players
ASEC Mimosas players
CS Sfaxien players
El Gouna FC players
Altay S.K. footballers
Ligue 1 (Ivory Coast) players
Tunisian Ligue Professionnelle 1 players
Egyptian Premier League players
Süper Lig players
Association football midfielders
Ivorian expatriate footballers
Ivorian expatriate sportspeople in Tunisia
Ivorian expatriates in Egypt
Ivorian expatriate sportspeople in Turkey
Expatriate footballers in Tunisia
Expatriate footballers in Egypt
Expatriate footballers in Turkey